Bačka Topola is a town and municipality located in the North Bačka District of the autonomous province of Vojvodina, Serbia. The municipality is composed of 23 local communities and has a population of 33,321, while the town itself has 14,573 inhabitants.

Name
The name of the town is derived from the Serbian word topola (топола) ("poplar" in English). The first part of the name of the town was given to designate its location in the region of Bačka in contrast to places with similar names, like Topola in Šumadija or Banatska Topola in Banat.

History
The town was mentioned first in 1462 under name Fibaych. This settlement was destroyed in the 16th century and new smaller settlement was later built at its location. Name Topola was first recorded in 1543, while according to the Ottoman defters from 1580, 1582, and 1590, it was mentioned as a village, whose population numbered between 21 and 23 houses. In this time, the inhabitants of the settlement were Serbs. In 1704, Topola was destroyed by kuruc rebels.

In 1731, Topola was mentioned as an uninhabited heath. In 1750, the new settlement was founded at this location and 200 Hungarian and Slovak families arrived here from Upper Hungary. It was a district center in Bács-Bodrog County as "Topolya" until 1918, when it became part of Kingdom of Serbs, Croats and Slovenes (renamed to Yugoslavia in 1929). It was part of Yugoslavia until 1991, with the exception of Hungarian occupation between 1941 and 1944 during World War II.

Inhabited places
Bačka Topola municipality includes the town of Bačka Topola and the following villages:
 Bagremovo
 Bački Sokolac
 Bajša 
 Bogaraš
 Gornja Rogatica 
 Gunaroš
 Karađorđevo 
 Kavilo
 Krivaja 
 Mali Beograd 
 Mićunovo 
 Njegoševo 
 Novo Orahovo
 Obornjača
 Pačir
 Panonija 
 Pobeda
 Srednji Salaš 
 Stara Moravica
 Svetićevo 
 Tomislavci
 Zobnatica

Note: For the inhabited places with an absolute or relative Hungarian ethnic majority, the names are also given in Hungarian.

Demographics

According to the 2011 census results, the municipality of Bačka Topola has a population of 33,321 inhabitants.

Ethnic groups

Local communities with a Hungarian majority are: Bačka Topola (Hungarian: Topolya), Bajša (Hungarian: Bajsa), Pačir (Hungarian: Pacsér), Stara Moravica (Hungarian: Bácskossuthfalva), Zobnatica (Hungarian: Andrásnépe), Bogaraš (Hungarian: Bogaras-Felváros), Obornjača (Hungarian: Nagyvölgy), Bagremovo (Hungarian: Brazília), Gunaroš (Hungarian: Gunaras), Novo Orahovo (Hungarian: Zentagunaras), and Kavilo (Hungarian: Rákóczifalu or Kavilló).

Local communities with a Serb majority are: Gornja Rogatica, Srednji Salaš, Panonija, Orešković, Bački Sokolac, Karađorđevo, Mićunovo, Njegoševo, Krivaja, Svetićevo, and Mali Beograd.

Pobeda (Hungarian: Győztes or Pobedabirtok) is an ethnically-mixed local community with a Hungarian relative majority. Krivaja, Mali Beograd, and Svetićevo have over 20% Hungarians, as well as other minorities, while Bačka Topola, Pačir, Zobnatica, and Pobeda have over 20% Serbs.

The ethnic composition of the municipality:

Economy
The following table gives a preview of total number of employed people per their core activity (as of 2016):

Sport
The most popular local football team is TSC Bačka Topola, that plays in the Serbian SuperLiga (1st national tier).

Notable people
 Branko Bošković former football player
 Andrija Kaluđerović football player
 Félix Lajkó violinist, zither player, composer, movie actor
 Nikola Žigić former football player
 György Mezey former football player and manager
 Branislav Simić Greco-Roman wrestler, Olympic champion
 Eleonora Wild former basketball player, Olympic and World Championship silver medalist
 István Dudás former football player
 Paul Kray soldier
 Dušan Tadić football player

International relations

Twin towns — Sister cities
Bačka Topola is twinned with:
  Belváros-Lipótváros, Hungary
  Gheorgheni, Romania
  Kiskunmajsa, Hungary
  Rožňava, Slovakia
  Szentes, Hungary

See also
 List of cities, towns and villages in Vojvodina
 List of Hungarian communities in Vojvodina
 List of places in Serbia

References
 Slobodan Ćurčić, Broj stanovnika Vojvodine, Novi Sad, 1996.

External links

 Official site
 Live cameras from Bačka Topola
 History of Bačka Topola 
 Crveni krst Bačka Topola

 
Places in Bačka
Populated places in North Bačka District
Municipalities and cities of Vojvodina
Hungarian communities in Serbia
Towns in Serbia